The 2008 FIA GT Nogaro 2 Hours was the eighth round of the 2008 FIA GT Championship season.  It took place at the Circuit Paul Armagnac, France, on 5 October 2008.

Race results
Class winners in bold.  Cars failing to complete 75% of winner's distance marked as Not Classified (NC).

† – #51 AF Corse was given a 30-second time penalty after the race, the equivalent of a drive-through penalty.

Statistics
 Pole Position – #5 Carsport Holland – 1:23.703
 Average Speed –

References

Nogaro
FIA GT Nogaro